Muddat is a 1986 Indian Hindi-language film directed by K. Bapaiah, starring Mithun Chakraborty, Jaya Prada, Padmini Kolhapure  along with Kader Khan, Shakti Kapoor and Asrani. The film was a remake of Telugu film Chattamtho Poratam.

Plot

Bharti, a law student, lives with her widower and blind dad. Ravi Shankar Singh is a singer and dancer; Bharti is a fan of him and never misses his music concerts. One day Bharti is shocked to see Ravi being arrested by the police. She finds out that Ravi has confessed to the killing of a man, Rana Singh, and will soon be hanged. Bharti attends Ravi's last concert, but Ravi abducts her and forcibly marries her. After the marriage, Ravi is arrested and appears in court. It is revealed that Ravi and Bharti had conspired together to overturn Ravi's death penalty to life imprisonment, but the court is still not convinced and upholds Ravi's death penalty. Ravi's innocence or guilt is revealed in the climax.

Cast
Mithun Chakraborty as Ravi Shankar Singh 
Jaya Prada as Bharati Singh 
Padmini Kolhapure as Kalpana 
Sadashiv Amrapurkar as Bharati's Father
Shakti Kapoor as Jailor Kripal Singh 
Kader Khan as Thakur Gajendra Singh 
Asrani as Heera
Shreeram Lagoo as Vikram Singh 
Urmila Bhatt as Mrs. Vikram Singh 
Ashok Saraf as Narayan
Rajesh Puri as Moti 
Satyendra Kapoor as Dayaram
Vikas Anand as Police Inspector
Yunus Parvez as Police Inspector
Goga Kapoor as Prosecuting Lawyer
Roopesh Kumar as Bhagwat Singh 
Manik Irani as Patthar

Songs

External links
 
 http://ibosnetwork.com/asp/filmbodetails.asp?id=Muddat 

1986 films
1980s Hindi-language films
Indian action films
Films directed by K. Bapayya
Films scored by Bappi Lahiri
Hindi remakes of Telugu films
1986 action films